Pepita Ferrari (1952 - 2018) was a Canadian filmmaker. In 1994 she began her long-standing relationship with the National Film Board of Canada, who produced seven of her films, five of which are available to stream online in both English and French. Her directorial debut By Woman's Hand was a documentary about the Beaver Hall Group, a group of Canadian women painters, who were associated with the Group of Seven. Ferrari focused on the three most prominent artists from the group: Prudence Heward, Sarah Robertson and Anne Savage. Her 2010 documentary Capturing Reality: The Art of Documentary features well-known living documentary filmmakers such as Nick Broomfield, Werner Herzog, Kim Longinotto and Errol Morris watching their own films and discussing the technical and ethical choices that guided their work. The film sets out to answer the question - “What is documentary?” - by taking the viewer through the process of creating a documentary from initial idea to final edit. Ferrari also wrote for Point of View, a Canadian magazine about documentary film and photography.

Filmography

References

External links 
 
 Pepita Ferrari at Canada LinkedIn

1952 births
2018 deaths
Canadian women film directors
Canadian documentary film directors
Canadian women documentary filmmakers